Lower Tapi Dam (or Padalsare Dam) is an earthfill dam on Tapti river near Amalner, but in Jalgaon  district in state of Maharashtra in India.

Specifications

Purpose
 Irrigation

See also
 Dams in Maharashtra
 List of reservoirs and dams in India

References

Dams in Jalgaon district
Year of establishment missing